Vladimir Vasilyevich Dementyev (born 14 January 1957) is a Soviet breaststroke swimmer who won two medals at the 1977 Summer Universiade. He also competed at the 1976 Summer Olympics, but did not reach the finals.

In 1978, he graduated from the Lipetsk Institute of Pedagogy and until 1998 worked there as an assistant professor, section head and then dean of the Faculty of Sports. In 2007, he defended a PhD in pedagogy, and has about 60 publications in this field.

After retirement from senior swimming he competed in the masters category and won a silver medal  at the world championships in 1992 and a bronze medal at the European championships in 1993, both in the 50 m breaststroke. In the same event he set seven world, European and national records and won all national titles in 1989–1990 (USSR) and 1992–2000 (Russia). Since 1992 he is the president of the Russian association of masters swimming, and since 1998 is a member of the Russian Olympic Committee. He is the head of the sports administration of the Lipetsk Oblast. In 2007 he was awarded the medal of the Medal of the Order "For Merit to the Fatherland" (II class).

References

1957 births
Living people
Russian male swimmers
Soviet male breaststroke swimmers
Swimmers at the 1976 Summer Olympics
Olympic swimmers of the Soviet Union
Soviet male swimmers
Universiade medalists in swimming
Recipients of the Medal of the Order "For Merit to the Fatherland" II class
Universiade silver medalists for the Soviet Union
Universiade bronze medalists for the Soviet Union
Medalists at the 1977 Summer Universiade
Sportspeople from Lipetsk